Abla Kamel Mohamed Afifi (  ) is an Egyptian actress.

Biography
Originally from Nikla Al Inab in Beheira Governorate, Abla Kamel graduated from the Faculty of Arts Department of Libraries in 1984 and started her career in theater Vanguard. She first participated in mono drama, heart health centers, then with Mohamed Sobhi. She married actor Ahmad Kamal, with whom she had two daughters. She later married actor Mahmoud El Gendy.

Filmography

References

External links
https://instagram.com/ablakame
 Instagram

1960 births
Actresses from Cairo
Living people
20th-century Egyptian actresses
21st-century Egyptian actresses
Egyptian film actresses
Egyptian Muslims